Morimopsis lacrymans is a species of beetle in the family Cerambycidae. It was described by James Thomson in 1857. It is known from India.

References

Morimopsini
Beetles described in 1857